Brongniartia is a genus of cebrionine beetle, named after French naturalist Adolphe Brongniart, and containing a single species, Brongniartia atra.

References 

Cebrionini